Tomas Gintarasovich Rukas (born 4 September 1996) is a Russian football player. He plays for SKA-Khabarovsk.

Club career
He made his professional debut in the Russian Professional Football League for FC Sibir-2 Novosibirsk on 5 September 2013 in a game against FC Sakhalin Yuzhno-Sakhalinsk.

On 20 July 2017, he signed a 4-year contract with FC Zenit Saint Petersburg. He made his Russian Football National League debut for FC Zenit-2 Saint Petersburg on 26 July 2017 in a game against FC Sibir Novosibirsk.

On 29 January 2021, he signed with Russian Premier League club FC Rostov. On 19 August 2021, he returned to Yenisey Krasnoyarsk on loan with an option to buy.

Personal life
He is a twin brother of Andrius Rukas.

References

External links
 
 

1996 births
People from Raseiniai District Municipality
Russian people of Lithuanian descent
Twin sportspeople
Living people
Lithuanian footballers
Lithuania youth international footballers
Russian footballers
Association football defenders
FC Sibir Novosibirsk players
FC Lokomotiv Moscow players
U.D. Leiria players
Getafe CF B players
Sporting CP B players
FC Zenit-2 Saint Petersburg players
FC Yenisey Krasnoyarsk players
FC Rostov players
FC SKA-Khabarovsk players
Russian Second League players
Campeonato de Portugal (league) players
Segunda División B players
Liga Portugal 2 players
Russian First League players
Russian expatriate footballers
Expatriate footballers in Portugal
Russian expatriate sportspeople in Portugal
Expatriate footballers in Spain
Russian expatriate sportspeople in Spain